is a railway station in Itoigawa, Niigata, Japan, operated by West Japan Railway Company (JR West).

Lines
Kotaki Station is served by the Ōito Line and is 21.7 kilometers from the intermediate terminus of the line at Minami-Otari Station, and is 91.8 kilometers from the terminus of the line at Matsumoto Station.

Station layout
The station consists of one ground-level island platform serving two tracks, connected to the station building by a level crossing. The station is unattended.

Platforms

History
Kotaki Station opened on 24 December 1935. With the privatization of Japanese National Railways (JNR) on 1 April 1987, the station came under the control of JR West.

Passenger statistics
In fiscal 2016, the station was used by an average of 3 passengers daily (boarding passengers only).

Surrounding area
Himekawa No.6 Hydroelectric Power Plant

See also
 List of railway stations in Japan

References

External links

 JR West station information 

Railway stations in Niigata Prefecture
Railway stations in Japan opened in 1935
Ōito Line
Stations of West Japan Railway Company
Itoigawa, Niigata